Shane Burger (born 31 August 1982) is a South African former cricketer who played first-class cricket for KwaZulu-Natal Inland. In January 2019, he was appointed as the head coach of the Scotland national cricket team. On his appointment, Burger said he was "both delighted and honoured". In January 2022, Burger was appointed Somerset’s assistant coach and left his position as head coach of the Scottish team.

References

External links
 

1982 births
Living people
South African cricketers
South African cricket coaches
Coaches of the Scotland national cricket team
Gauteng cricketers
KwaZulu-Natal Inland cricketers
Place of birth missing (living people)